The 2014 Intercity Football League (known as the MediaTek Intercity Football League for sponsorship reasons) was the eighth season of the Intercity Football League since its establishment in 2007. The season began on 7 June 2014， Taipei City Tatung were the defending champions.

Clubs
A total of 8 clubs will contest the league, including five sides from the 2013 season and three new clubs.

Stadia and locations 
Note: Table lists in alphabetical order.

Preliminary stage
The preliminary stage are held from May 16 to 18, 2014. All three matches are held in Bailing Stadium. 

The top two team qualified to the "2014 Intercity Football League".

Standings and results
This season is divided into two half seasons, every team have their own home venue. Each half season's champion will have a final match to determine which is the final champion. If each half season's champion are the same team, then this team would be the champion of 2014 season.

These are the results for all the 2014 seasons.

First half

Second half

Final match
The winners from each season will play a match to determine which is the champion of 2014 season, and enter the 2015 AFC Cup play-off stage. As the winners from each season are the same team, so Taiwan Power Company win the 2015 AFC Cup play-off slot. However, due to their low AFC MAs' ranking, they can not participate in this tournament.

References

External links
Chinese Taipei Football Association
FIFA.com standings
Soccerway: Inter City League 2014

Top level Taiwanese football league seasons
Intercity Football League seasons
Taipei
1